Nicola Franceschina (born May 26, 1977) is an Italian short track speed skater who competed in the 1998 Winter Olympics, in the 2002 Winter Olympics, and in the 2006 Winter Olympics.

He was born in Bormio.

In 1998 he was a member of the Italian relay team which finished fourth in the 5000 metre relay competition.

Four years later he won the silver medal in the 5000 metre relay contest. In the 500 metre event he finished twelfth.

At the 2006 Games he was part of the Italian team which finished fourth in the 5000 metre relay contest.

External links
 profile
Nicola Franceschina at ISU

1977 births
Living people
Italian male short track speed skaters
Olympic short track speed skaters of Italy
Short track speed skaters at the 1998 Winter Olympics
Short track speed skaters at the 2002 Winter Olympics
Short track speed skaters at the 2006 Winter Olympics
Olympic silver medalists for Italy
Sportspeople from the Province of Sondrio
Olympic medalists in short track speed skating
Medalists at the 2002 Winter Olympics
Universiade medalists in short track speed skating
Universiade gold medalists for Italy
Universiade silver medalists for Italy
Competitors at the 1997 Winter Universiade
Competitors at the 1999 Winter Universiade
20th-century Italian people